Banksia mucronulata subsp. mucronulata is a subspecies of Banksia mucronulata (swordfish dryandra). As an autonym, it is defined as encompassing the type material of the species. It was known as Dryandra mucronulata subsp. mucronulata until 2007, when Austin Mast and Kevin Thiele transferred all Dryandra into Banksia. As with other members of Banksia ser. Dryandra, it is endemic to the South West Botanical Province of Western Australia.

References

Further reading
 
 
 
 

mucronulata subsp. mucronulata
Plant subspecies